Sahana Udupa is a media anthropologist. She is a professor at Ludwig-Maximilians-Universität Munich, Germany, with a research focus on online extreme speech, disinformation and digital media politics. She serves on several editorial and advisory boards and regularly takes part in popular media   and policy debates  around online abuse and fake news dissemination.

Career 
Sahana Udupa received her Ph.D. from the National Institute of Advanced Studies in Bangalore and has been a visiting Ph.D. scholar at the Center for Global Communication Studies within the Annenberg School for Communication. She has been Research Fellow at the Max Planck Institute for the Study of Religious and Ethnic Diversity from 2011 to 2016, after which she joined the School of Public Policy at the Central European University as Associate Professor of Journalism and Media Studies. She is currently leading two research projects funded by the European Research Council, ONLINERPOL: ForDigitalDignity and AI4Dignity, at the Institute of Social and Cultural Anthropology at LMU Munich and is an advisory board member at the Social Science Research Council’s initiative on digital disinformation research.  Udupa has recently been named Joan Shorenstein Fellow at Harvard University.

Awards 

 2022 Franqui Chair award by Franqui Foundation (Belgium)

Publications (selection)

Books & edited volumes 
Udupa, S., Gagliardone, I. and Hervik, P. (2021). Digital Hate: The Global Conjuncture of Extreme Speech. Indiana University Press.
Udupa, S. and McDowell, S. (2017). Media as Politics in South Asia. London and New York: Routledge, Taylor & Francis Group.
Udupa, S. (2015). Making News in Global India: Media, Publics, Politics. Cambridge: Cambridge University Press.

Papers 
Udupa, S., Venkatraman, S. and Khan, A. (2020). “Millennial India”: Global Digital Politics in Context. Television & New Media, 21(4), pp. 343–359
Udupa, S., Gagliardone, I., Deem, A. and Csuka, L. (2020). Hate Speech, Information Disorder, and Conflict. Social Science Research Council.
Udupa, S. (2019). Nationalism in the Digital Age: Fun as a Metapractice of Extreme Speech. International Journal of Communication, 13, pp. 3143–3163.
Udupa, S. (2018). Gaali cultures: The politics of abusive exchange on social media. New Media & Society, 20(4), pp. 1506–1522.
Udupa, S. (2018). Enterprise Hindutva and social media in urban India. Contemporary South Asia, 26(4), pp. 453–467.

Interviews 
Pentney, K. and Udupa, S. (2021). Episode 5: Moderating Global Voices.
Grover, N. and Udupa, S. (2021). Q&A: Why cultural nuance matters in the fight against online extreme speech.
Reuter, L. and Udupa, S. (2020). At the heart of data driven digital capitalism: Interview with Sahana Udupa from LMU Munich about extreme speech cultures online.
Gödde, M. and Udupa, S. (2020). Extreme Speech on Social Media: Defending Dignity in a Digital World.
Scherf, M. and Udupa, S. (2018). "Mein Job ist es, die dunkle Seite zu beleuchten".

References

External links 
 ForDigitalDignity homepage
 AI4Dignity homepage 
 LMU faculty profile

Living people
Women anthropologists
Social sciences writers
Indian anthropologists
Academic staff of the Ludwig Maximilian University of Munich

Year of birth missing (living people)